Worldham is a civil parish in Hampshire, England. East Worldham is the main settlement in Worldham Parish, a civil parish with a population of approximately 310, within the East Hampshire district. It is situated about two miles south east of Alton on B3004 road. It has two neighbouring villages, East Worldham and West Worldham. It also contains the hamlet of Hartley Mauditt in its boundaries.

See also
 East Worldham
 West Worldham
 Hartley Mauditt

References

External links
 Worldham Parish Website

Villages in Hampshire